The Chaetosphaeriales are an order of fungi within the class Sordariomycetes.

Families
As accepted by Wijayawardene et al. 2020 (with amount of genera per family);
 Chaetosphaeriaceae (52)
 Helminthosphaeriaceae (4)
 Leptosporellaceae (1)
 Linocarpaceae (3)

Genera incertae sedis
Listed in 2020;
 Calvolachnella  (1)
 Caudatispora  (2)
 Erythromada  (1)
 Lasiosphaeriella  (6)
 Neoleptosporella  (2)
 Neonawawia  (1)
 Rimaconus  (2)

References

 
Ascomycota orders